Vidar Riseth (born 21 April 1972) is a Norwegian former professional footballer who played as a centre-back or midfielder. He played for Neset, Rosenborg, Kongsvinger, Lillestrøm and Strømsgodset in Norway, and Luton Town, LASK Linz, Celtic and 1860 Munich abroad. He played 52 times for the Norway national team, scoring four goals, and played for his country at the 1998 World Cup and Euro 2000. He retired as a professional footballer in June 2010. He later worked as a professional football commentator.

Club career

Early career
Riseth joined Rosenborg from local side Neset in January 1991. He played one game in the 1992 championship winning season, but had more games as Rosenborg won back to back in 1993. In 1994, he joined Kongsvinger. He played there for three seasons, scoring regularly as he played as a centre forward at this time of his career. Late in his Kongsvinger career, he went for a brief loan to Luton.

On 20 March 2000, while playing for Scottish club Celtic, he scored the opening goal in the 2000 Scottish League Cup Final, which Celtic went on to win 2–0. In November, he moved on loan to German club 1860 Munich until the end of the season. At the end of his loan spell, the two clubs discussed making the deal permanent.

He returned to Norway to play for Rosenborg, and on 24 October 2007, helped secure their first UEFA Champions League home victory in six years, scoring the second in a shock 2–0 win against Spanish club Valencia.

Career statistics

International

Scores and results list Norway's goal tally first, score column indicates score after each Riseth goal.

Honours
Rosenborg
Tippeligaen: 1993, 2003, 2004, 2006
Norwegian Cup: 2003

Celtic
League Cup: 1999–2000

References

External links

Kniksen Award winners
Lillestrøm SK players
Rosenborg BK players
Strømsgodset Toppfotball players
Kongsvinger IL Toppfotball players
LASK players
Celtic F.C. players
Luton Town F.C. players
TSV 1860 Munich players
Norwegian footballers
Norway international footballers
1998 FIFA World Cup players
UEFA Euro 2000 players
Scottish Premier League players
Bundesliga players
Austrian Football Bundesliga players
Eliteserien players
Expatriate footballers in England
Expatriate footballers in Austria
Expatriate footballers in Germany
Expatriate footballers in Scotland
Norwegian expatriate sportspeople in Scotland
Norwegian expatriate sportspeople in Austria
Norwegian expatriate sportspeople in Germany
People from Frosta
1972 births
Living people
Norwegian expatriate footballers
Association football central defenders
Association football midfielders
English Football League players
Sportspeople from Trøndelag
Norwegian expatriate sportspeople in England